The 1975–76 European Cup Winners' Cup was the 16th season of the European Cup Winners' Cup, a club football tournament organised by UEFA for the winners of its member associations' domestic cup competitions. It was won by Anderlecht of Belgium, who beat West Ham United of England in the final. Anderlecht went on to reach the next two finals as well, and won the second of them.

First round

|}

First leg

Second leg

Anderlecht won 2–1 on aggregate.

Fiorentina won 6–0 on aggregate.

Atlético Madrid won 3–2 on aggregate.

Second round

|}

First leg

Second leg

1–1 on aggregate; Sachsenring Zwickau won 5–4 on penalties.

Quarter-finals

|}

Semi-finals

|}

Final

See also
1975–76 European Cup
1975–76 UEFA Cup

External links
 1975–76 competition at UEFA website
 Cup Winners' Cup results at Rec.Sport.Soccer Statistics Foundation

3
UEFA Cup Winners' Cup seasons